The Shenzhen Stock Exchange (SZSE) is a stock exchange based in the city of Shenzhen, in the People's Republic of China. It is one of three stock exchanges operating independently in Mainland China, the others being the Beijing Stock Exchange and the Shanghai Stock Exchange. It is situated in the Futian district of Shenzhen.

History 

On December 1, 1990, Shenzhen Stock Exchange was founded. In January 1992, Deng Xiaoping's Southern Tour saved China's capital market and the two stock exchanges (the other is Shanghai Stock Exchange). In July 1997, the State Council of China decided that the Shenzhen Stock Exchange would be directly managed by the China Securities Regulatory Commission. In May 2004, the SME Board was launched. In October 2009, the ChiNext market  was inaugurated.

Hours
The exchange has pre-market sessions from 09:15am to 09:25am and normal trading sessions from 09:30am to 11:30am and 1:00pm to 3:00pm China Standard Time (UTC+08:00) on all days of the week except Saturdays, Sundays and holidays declared by the Exchange in advance.

ChiNext
The exchange opened the ChiNext board,
a NASDAQ-type exchange for high-growth, high-tech start-ups, on October 23, 2009.

Overview 
ChiNext is also called the second stock trading market. It refers to the securities trading market outside the main board. It provides growth space for small and medium-sized enterprises and emerging companies that cannot be listed in the main board. It is an effective supplement to the main board market. The biggest feature of the ChiNext is that it has low entry barriers and strict operation requirements, which help potential small and medium-sized enterprises obtain financing opportunities.

Influences 
The influences of ChiNext includes boosting innovation and entrepreneurship and attracting foreign investment. Specifically, ChiNext has played a key role in promoting innovation and entrepreneurship in China by providing a platform for smaller and innovative companies to raise capital and grow their businesses. This has led to the development of startups and technology companies in China.

Market data
(As of  January 2021)
Listed companies: 2,375
Market capitalization: RMB 34,463,161.66million (US$5.24 trillion)

Listings

Major listing requirements 
The listing requirements for the Shenzhen Stock Exchange (SZSE) are established by the China Securities Regulatory Commission and are designed to ensure the quality of companies listed on the exchange. The major listing requirements for the SZSE include:

 Minimum size requirements: Companies seeking to list on the SZSE must have a certain level of size, as measured by net assets or revenue. 
 Financial performance: Companies must demonstrate a strong financial performance, with a track record of profitability and positive cash flow. Specifically, one of the following requirements must be met: 1.The estimated market value is not less than 1 billion yuan, the net profit in the most recent year is positive, and the operating income is not less than 100 million yuan; 2. The estimated market value is not less than 5 billion yuan, and the operating income in the most recent year is not less than 300 million yuan.
 Corporate governance: Companies must demonstrate a commitment to good corporate governance, with a clear and transparent management structure. Specifically, the issuer’s basic accounting practice is proper and its preparation and disclosure of the financial statements is in compliance with the Accounting Standards for Business Enterprises and relevant information disclosure rules, and fairly reflects in all material respects its financial position, the results of operations and cash flows, and its financial report has been issued an unqualified opinion by a CPA in the last three years.
 Disclosure and transparency: Companies must provide full and timely disclosure of financial and other information, and must comply with all regulatory reporting requirements.

Building
Its construction started in 2008 and was finished in 2013.The building was designed by Rem Koolhaas's firm, the Office for Metropolitan Architecture. The building is located at 2012 Shennan Blvd., Futian District. With an area of 200,000 square metres, five high speed elevators and a futuristic design, the partners involved in the design and construction of this sky scraper included Rem Koolhaas, David Gianotten, Ellen van Loon and Shohei Shigematsu and construction by The Second Construction Co., Ltd of China Construction Third Engineering Bureau, a subsidiary of China State Construction Engineering Corporation.

See also
 China Securities Regulatory Commission
 Hong Kong Stock Exchange
Shanghai Stock Exchange
 Untraded shares
Deng Xiaoping's Southern Tour

Lists
List of companies of China
List of East Asian stock exchanges
List of stock exchanges

References

External links
 

 
Financial services companies established in 1990
Office buildings completed in 2013
Economy of Shenzhen
Organizations based in Shenzhen
Skyscraper office buildings in Shenzhen
Stock exchanges in China
Rem Koolhaas buildings
Chinese companies established in 2013
Chinese companies established in 1990